Achu soup is a traditional food in Cameroon, a yellow soup. It is made with cocoyam. Spices, water, palm oil, and "canwa or Nikki" (limestone), and fish are other ingredients.

References

Cameroonian cuisine
Soups
Taro dishes